Angiology is a peer-reviewed academic journal that publishes papers in the field of Vascular disease. The journal's editor is Dimitri P. Mikhailidis, M.D., FRCPATH (Royal Free and University College Medical School). It has been in publication since 1950 and is currently published by SAGE Publications.

Scope 
Angiology aims to publish papers and case reports relative to all phases of all vascular diseases. The journal covers areas such as diagnostic methods, therapeutic approaches, and clinical and laboratory research and also publishes special issues and supplements relating to specific topics of current interest to surgeons and internists.

Abstracting and indexing 
Angiology is abstracted and indexed in, among other databases:  SCOPUS, and the Social Sciences Citation Index. According to the Journal Citation Reports, its 2010 impact factor is 0.992, ranking it 56 out of 66 journals in the category ‘Peripheral Vascular Disease’.

References

External links 
 

SAGE Publishing academic journals
English-language journals